D.L. Lang (born 1983, Bad Hersfeld, West Germany) is an American poet. She has published twelve full-length books of poetry, and served as the Poet Laureate of Vallejo, California.

Early life

Diana Lucille Lang (née Kettle) was born in Bad Hersfeld, West Germany. As a result of growing up in a military family as a child Lang relocated frequently, residing in Herleshausen, West Germany, Santa Fe, Texas, Alexandria, Louisiana, and Enid, Oklahoma. Lang graduated from Enid High School in 2001, received an Associate of Science in General Studies at Northern Oklahoma College, and obtained a Bachelor of Arts in Film Studies with a minor in Judaic Studies from the University of Oklahoma. After college she moved to California in 2005 and married Timothy Lang in 2006, living in San Rafael, California prior to moving to Vallejo.

Film and television

While in college Lang worked as a video editor at television station KXOK-LD, as webmaster for University of Oklahoma student radio station the Wire, and as a band promoter for Grey from Enid, Oklahoma. She also created documentary films and music videos, including Liquid Wind, a kiteboarding film by director Charles Maupin that features an interview with Mike Morgan, which was broadcast on Oklahoma PBS affiliate OETA, and The Hebrew Project, a Hebrew language film that featured University of Oklahoma professors Ori Kritz and Norman Stillman, which was broadcast on The Jewish Channel.

Poetry
Lang began writing poetry as a child, first attempting to write song lyrics. She cites Dan Nichols, The Beatles, Pete Seeger, Allen Ginsberg, Jim Morrison, and Bob Dylan as influences. In addition to writing about her life, Lang writes on themes of Judaism, social justice, political protest, feminism, anti-capitalism, anti-racism and pacifism. Lang began performing her poetry in 2015, following a debut reading at her synagogue. Her poems have been published in newspapers, journals, and anthologies.

Vallejo Poet Laureate

D.L. Lang was appointed Poet Laureate of Vallejo, California in September 2017 and served through December 2019. As poet laureate Lang edited the poetry anthology Verses, Voices & Visions of Vallejo and performed 141 times in 18 different cities. Lang gave the invocation at the 2019 Vallejo Women's March. During her tenure she also performed her poetry at many local events, including Vallejo Unites Against Hatred, Unity Day, International Peace Day  and Why Poetry Matters. Lang also gave a presentation on Emma Lazarus and Alicia Ostriker for AAUW Voices of Change. Lang also judged seven contests including the county Poetry Out Loud high school recitation competition, Joel Fallon poetry scholarship, Solano County Fair talent competition, Vallejo poetry slam, and county library teen writing competition. She performed regularly on air on KZCT and on stage at Poetry by the Bay. Like her predecessor, she led the Poetry in Notion poetry circle and hosted annual events for National Poetry Month. She attended poets laureate conferences in Tujunga and San Mateo. Lang was preceded as Vallejo's poet laureate by Genea Brice, and succeeded by Jeremy Snyder, host of Poetry by the Bay.

2020-present
In 2020 she was a featured act at the Solano County Virtual Fair, and judged the library's teen poetry competition. In 2021 she performed virtually for Poetry Flash and Point Arena Third Thursday Poetry. She also performed with Brice and Snyder at Alibi Bookshop, and for the Jewish Democrats of Solano County. In 2022 she performed for the AAUW, Solano County Library, San Francisco Public Library, a beat poetry festival at the Empress Theatre, the abortion rights group RiseUp4AbortionRights, the Beat Museum and LaborFest with the Revolutionary Poets Brigade, judged the Solano library's teen poetry competition, and appeared on the Rooted in Poetry podcast. She continues to perform poetry live on air at KZCT radio. In 2023 she performed at a labor protest against Elon Musk.

Works

Poetry collections

  Tea and Sprockets  2011. 
  Abundant Sparks and Personal Archeology 2013. 
  Look, Ma! No Hands!  2015. 
  Poet Loiterer  2016. 
  Id Biscuits  2016. 
  Barefoot in the Sanctuary  2016. 
  Armor Against the Dawn  2016. 
  Dragonfly Tomorrows and Dog-eared Yesterdays 2017. 
  Resting on my Laurels  2018. 
  The Cafe of Dreams  2018. 
  Midnight Strike  2019.  
  This Festival of Dreams  2020. 
  Heaven is Portable  2022.

Spoken Word Albums
Happy Accidents 2015.

Poetry Anthologies

Editor 
 Verses, Voices & Visions of Vallejo 2019.

Contributor 
 A Poet's Siddur: Friday Evening Liturgy Through the Eyes of Poets Ain't Got No Press. 2017. 
 Light & Shadow Benicia Literary Arts. 2018. 
 Marin Poetry Center Anthology, Vol. 21 Marin Poetry Center. 2018.  
 Verses, Voices & Visions of Vallejo 2019. 
 Colossus: Home: An Anthology of Lives in and out of Place Colossus Press. 2020. 
 Introspective BloodRedStar Publications. 2020. 
 The Alien Buddha Wears a Black Bandanna Alien Buddha Press. 2020. 
 Black Lives Matter: Poems for a New World Civic Leicester. 2020. 
 Happy Fukkadays 2 U from the Alien Buddha Alien Buddha Press. 2020. 
 Poems of Political Protest City Limits Publishing. 2020. 
 Musings During a Time of Pandemic: A World Anthology of Poems on COVID-19 Kistrech Theatre International. 2020. 
 Poetry: The Best of 2020 Inner Child Press. 2020. 
 From the Soil: A Hometown Anthology Exeter Publishing. 2020. 
 Birth Lifespan Vol. 1 Pure Slush Books. 2021. 
 Red Skies: A Creators Response to 2020 Splintered Disorder Press. 2021. 
 2020: Our Voices Barnes & Noble Press. 2021. 
 Insurrection Gnashing Teeth Publishing. 2021. 
 The Alien Buddha Skips the Party Alien Buddha Press. 2021. 
 Globalisation: A Poetry Collection Making Magic Happen Press. 2021. 
 Pandemic Evolution: Days 1-100 Sheila-Na-Gig Editions. 2021. 
 The Alien Buddha Gets A Real Job Alien Buddha Press. 2021. 
 The Last Time the Alien Buddha Got Sooo High Alien Buddha Press. 2021. 
 Poems from the Heron Clan Vol. VIII Katherine James Books. 2021. 
 Adfectus Exeter Publishing. 2021. 
 Good Cop/Bad Cop Flowersong Press. 2021. 
 Anthology House, Vol. 2 ASEI Arts. 2021. 
 The Rastaman: Conversations with Bob Marley Alien Buddha Press. 2021. 
 When this is all over... Creative Ink Publishing. 2021. 
 The Alien Buddha Goes Pop Alien Buddha Press. 2021. 
 Together Behind Four Walls Goldcrest Books. 2021. 
 Protest 2021 Moonstone Arts Center. 2021. 
 I Can’t Breathe: A Poetic Anthology of Social Justice Kistrech Theatre International. 2021. 
 IFLAC Peace Anthology: Human Trafficking and Modern Slavery International Forum for the Literature and Culture of Peace. 2021. 
 Reimagine America: An anthology for the future Vagabond Books. 2022. 
 International Women’s Day 2022 Moonstone Arts Center. 2022. 
 Resist with every Inch and Breath Lonely Cryptid Media. 2022. 
 Psalms of the Alien Buddha, Vol. 2 Alien Buddha Press. 2022. 
 May Day 2022 Moonstone Arts Center. 2022. 
 Poetry is Dead: An Inclusive Anthology of Deadhead Poetry Hercules Publishing. 2022. 
 Yearning to Breathe Free: A Community Journal of 2020 Benicia Literary Arts. 2022. 
 Storm Warning: Poets for the Planet Building Socialism Revolutionary Poets Brigade. 2022. 
 The Protest Diaries B Cubed Press. 2022. 
 Hiroshima Day Moonstone Arts Center. 2022. 
 When There are Nine Moon Tide Press. 2022. 
 Colossus: Freedom Colossus Press. 2022. 
 Remembering Jack Kerouac on his 100th Birthday New Generation Beat Publications. 2022. 
 Banned Books Week Moonstone Arts Center. 2022. 
 The Alien Buddha’s Microdoses Alien Buddha Press. 2022. 
 Nooks & Crannies Benicia Literary Arts. 2022. 
 26th Annual Poetry Ink Anthology Moonstone Press. 2022. 
 American Graveyard: Calls to End Gun Violence Read or Green Books. 2023. 
 The Alien Buddha Gets Rejected, Vol. 2 Alien Buddha Press. 2023.

Poetry Publications

Lang, D.L., "Prayer for Shomerim," Jewish Journal of Los Angeles, February 18, 2015 
Lang, D.L., “Sheltering in Places,” Benicia Herald, September 23, 2016
Lang, D.L., “Worldly Windows,” Benicia Herald, November 4, 2016 
Lang, D.L., “Stay,” Benicia Herald, December 3, 2016 
Lang, D.L., “Train Whistle Polka,” Benicia Herald, December 15, 2017 
Lang, D.L., “Benicia Bound,” Benicia Herald, January 5, 2018 
Lang, D.L., “Love Poetry Capital Blockade,” Benicia Herald, February 23, 2018 
Lang, D.L., “How to Swim through a Tornado,” Benicia Herald, June 15, 2018 
Lang, D.L., “The Woodpecker’s Beat,” Benicia Herald, September 7, 2018 
Lang, D.L., "Turning: A Poem for Yom Kippur," Reformjudaism.org, September 17, 2018
Lang, D.L., "49 Lights," Vallejo Times Herald, pg. A9, March 19, 2019
Lang, D.L., "No Other Planet," Poetry Expressed Vol. 5, Spring 2020
Lang, D.L., "One Thousand Per Day," Frost Meadow Review, April 1, 2020
Lang, D.L., “What Remains is Love,” Benicia Herald, pg A9, April 24, 2020
Lang, D.L., “July 4th, 2020,” Benicia Herald, pg A3, July 26, 2020
Lang, D.L., “Pandemic Mismanagement,” Benicia Herald, pg A3, September 30, 2020
Lang, D.L., “Commonalities,” The Lake County Bloom, September 16, 2021
Lang, D.L., “These Wild Winds,” The Lake County Bloom, September 23, 2021
Lang, D.L., “American Dream,” The Free Venice Beachhead, Vol. 470, January 2022
Lang, D.L., “Columbia River Gorgeous,” KALW Bay Poets, August 24, 2022
Lang, D.L., "Labor Shortage," Work & the Anthropocene, September 5, 2022
Lang, D.L., ”What Dreams Danced Here?” The Lake County Bloom, October 20, 2022
Lang, D.L., ”The Northwest” The Lake County Bloom, October 20, 2022
Lang, D.L., “Fire, Water, Wind,” Benicia Herald, January 8, 2023, page A5

Articles & Essays
Lang, Diana L., "Enid's Ties to Railroad History," Enid News & Eagle, October 16, 2019
 "A Collective Experience to Learn" Global Pandemic Crisis: A Series of Literary Essays on Quarantine Transcendent Zero Press. 2020.

See also 

 Genea Brice
 Jeremy Snyder
 List of municipal poets laureate in California

References

University of Oklahoma alumni
American women poets
Municipal Poets Laureate in the United States
Poets from California
Poets from Oklahoma
Living people
Writers from Enid, Oklahoma
German emigrants to the United States
Jewish American poets
People from Bad Hersfeld
1983 births
Writers from Vallejo, California
Enid High School alumni
21st-century American poets
Poets Laureate of Vallejo
Northern Oklahoma College alumni
Hessian emigrants to the United States
American pacifists
Jewish women writers
21st-century American women writers
Filmmakers from Enid, Oklahoma
Poets from Texas
Poets from Louisiana
Writers from Alexandria, Louisiana
People from Werra-Meißner-Kreis
People from Galveston County, Texas
People from Santa Fe, Texas
Writers from San Rafael, California
21st-century American Jews
Marxist poets
Communist poets
German LGBT poets
Proletarian literature
American people of Scotch-Irish descent
American LGBT poets